On 28 June 2011, a group of nine gunmen and suicide bombers attacked the Inter-Continental Hotel, Kabul. The attack and an ensuing five-hour siege left at least 21 people dead, including all nine attackers. Responsibility was claimed by the Taliban.

Background
Sixty to seventy guests were believed to be staying at the hotel at the time of the attacks. Thirty provincial government officials were staying at the hotel to attend a briefing about the transition of security responsibilities from the U.S. Military to the Afghan security forces. Most of the hotel's guests were in the hotel's dining hall at the time of the attack. Initial reports suggested that a wedding party may also have been hosted in one of the dance halls.

Attack
The attackers passed three security checkpoints and made their way to the rear of the hotel under concealment of thick vegetation. The assault on the hotel began at 10:00 p.m. local time armed with assault rifles, hand grenades, rocket-propelled grenade launchers, machine guns, and anti-aircraft weapons. Armed Afghan law enforcement personnel fled the area and failed to engage the attackers. Nine attackers were captured on surveillance camera entering through the rear hotel garden where only two guards were stationed during a dinner for hotel guests. Suicide vests were detonated at the entrance to the hotel and on the second floor. Two dance halls were destroyed in the initial attack. The attackers then ascended to the fifth floor. Exchanges of weapon fire between law enforcement occurred until the early morning hours.

Hotel guests were told to barricade themselves in their rooms; some escaped by jumping from the hotel's windows.

Termination of the attack
Entry forces ascended the first two floors killing a militant in the process. The security forces attempted to disarm the explosive vest the attacker was wearing. The attackers took up firing positions on the hotel roof when the fight entered its climactic end. Three combatants on the hotel roof were attacked by two of three circling NATO helicopters. The militants may have been killed in the strike or may have detonated their vests. One U.S. Blackhawk helicopter carried International Security Assistance Force (ISAF) snipers while an MC-12W Liberty and an MQ-1 Predator remotely piloted aircraft provided critical aerial surveillance. Afghan policemen could not be coaxed by police chief Mohammad Ayoub Salangi to enter the building after the attackers were killed. At one point, an Afghan intelligence official informed the press that it believed it had eliminated all but one militant. One injured suicide bomber hid in a hotel room and ambushed and killed a Spanish pilot after the declared conclusion of operations.

Electricity to the hotel was restored after the end of military operations, and a scheduled briefing on the transition of security responsibilities from the U.S. Military to the Afghan security forces proceeded the next day.

Victims
Among the wounded were five Afghan policemen and thirteen civilians. Five hotel staff including one hotel security guard and a hotel chef, and three policemen were killed.

Perpetrators
Taliban spokesman, Zabiullah Mujahid claimed Taliban responsibility for the attack and lauded the militants that killed "dozens of the foreign and local top-level officials". The Long War Journal reported that the attack was carried out by the "Kabul Attack Network". According to the Journal, the network was an ad hoc organization with insurgents and operatives from Afghan and Pakistani Taliban groups, the Haqqani network, Hizb-i-Islami Gulbuddin, and with support from Lashkar-e-Taiba and al Qaeda. The network is led by Dawood (also spelled Daud), the Taliban's shadow governor for Kabul, and Taj Mir Jawad, a leader in the Haqqani network. The Journal also stated that the organization is sometimes assisted by Pakistan's Inter-Services Intelligence agency.

The ISAF believes that the operation was supplied by the Haqqani network. Ismail Jan, Deputy to the senior Haqqani commander, was killed in an airstrike in Paktia province which borders Pakistan's FATA a day after the attack.

See also
 2018 Inter-Continental Hotel Kabul attack
 List of terrorist attacks in Kabul

References

2011 in Kabul
2011 murders in Afghanistan
2010s crimes in Kabul
2011 mass shootings in Asia
21st-century mass murder in Afghanistan
Attacks on buildings and structures in 2011
Attacks on buildings and structures in Kabul
Attacks on hotels in Asia
Islamic terrorist incidents in 2011
June 2011 crimes
June 2011 events in Afghanistan
Mass murder in Kabul
Mass murder in 2011
Mass shootings in Kabul
Suicide bombings in 2011
Suicide bombings in Kabul
Taliban bombings in Kabul
Terrorist incidents in Afghanistan in 2011
War in Afghanistan (2001–2021)
Building bombings in Afghanistan
Hotel bombings